Fredrik Samuelsson may refer to:
Fredrik Samuelsson (decathlete) (born 1995), Swedish track and field athlete
Fredrik Samuelsson (footballer) (born 1980), Swedish footballer and manager